The 2023 William & Mary Tribe football team will represent the College of William & Mary as a member of the Colonial Athletic Association (CAA) during the 2023 NCAA Division I FCS football season. The Tribe, led by fifth-year head coach Mike London, will play their home games at Zable Stadium.

Previous season

The Tribe finished 7–1 in regular season CAA games and tied New Hampshire as conference co-champions, their 13th in school history. They went 6–0 on the road in the regular season for the first time in program history. William & Mary earned the FCS playoffs automatic bid and made it to the national quarterfinals before losing 55–7 to the #3 team in the nation, Montana State. The 11 wins tied a school record previously set twice, in 2004 and 2009.

Schedule

Game summaries

at Campbell

Wofford

at Charleston Southern

Maine

at Elon

at Virginia

Towson

Monmouth

at Albany

at Hampton

Richmond

References

William and Mary
William & Mary Tribe football seasons
William and Mary Tribe football